Nymphicula manilensis is a moth in the family Crambidae. It was described by Sauber in 1899. It is found on Luzon in the Philippines.

References

Nymphicula
Moths described in 1899